The Montreal Junior Hockey Club (French: Le Club de Hockey Junior de Montréal) was a junior ice hockey team in the Quebec Major Junior Hockey League (QMJHL). The team was based out of the Verdun Auditorium, in Verdun, Quebec, Canada. The St. John's Fog Devils franchise relocated at the conclusion of the 2007–08 QMJHL season. The team's colours were maroon and white, similar to the Montreal Maroons.
The Quebec Major Junior Hockey League approved the sale of the Juniors to a group led by former NHL Defensemen Joel Bouchard who moved the team to Boisbriand, Quebec for the 2011–12 season. The team plays its games at the Centre d'Excellence Sports Rousseau and is known as the Blainville-Boisbriand Armada.

History
The team started out as the St. John's Fog Devils when Newfoundland was granted an expansion franchise. The team was sold to a group of people that moved the team to Montreal for the 2008–09 season. The team's inaugural captain was Matt Fillier who was also the last captain for St. John's.

Season by season
This is a list of seasons completed by the Montreal Junior Hockey Club. This list documents the records and playoff results for all seasons of the franchise since its inception in 2008.

Note: GP = Games played, W = Wins, L = Losses, T = Ties, OTL = Overtime losses, Pts = Points, GF = Goals for, GA = Goals against, PIM = Penalties in minutes, TG = Playoff series decided on total goals

Notable players

Luke Adam (born 1990), Canadian ice hockey player
T.J. Brennan (born 1989), American ice hockey player
Eliezer Sherbatov (born 1991), Canadian-Israeli ice hockey player

References

External links 
  (French only)

Defunct Quebec Major Junior Hockey League teams
Jun
Sports clubs disestablished in 2011
Verdun, Quebec
Ice hockey clubs established in 2008
2008 establishments in Quebec
2011 disestablishments in Quebec